Doce de Mãe is a Brazilian television film release as a year-end special with 01 episode (season 1, 2012), and a limited series with 14 episodes (season 2, 2014) produced by Casa de Cinema de Porto Alegre and broadcast by Rede Globo on December 27, 2012. It was written and directed by Jorge Furtado and Ana Luiza Azevedo, and Fernanda Montenegro stars as Dona Picucha.

Plot
Picucha (Fernanda Montenegro) may seem old-fashioned, but she has modern ideas and a great sense of humor. As the matriarch of a big family, she is involved in the daily lives of her children, grandchildren and other relatives. Undeterred by the typical problems of old age, she uses her many years of experience to solve problems in the best way possible. 
 
Her children are becoming less and less comfortable with the fact that she still lives alone in the house at her age. However, it is Picucha herself who surprises everyone when she makes the spontaneous decision to move to a nursing home.
 
She revolutionizes her new home by organizing gambling and concerts. It is there that she also has an idea about how to help her unemployed son—start a business that resells the benefits normally reserved for the elderly, such as parking places and preferential customer service. However, despite her lively lifestyle there, Picucha decides to leave the home and return to her family, thereby starting a sequence of living at her children's houses. 
 
In addition to all of these activities, this indefatigable woman still needs to address other issues such as the suspicion that her late husband had a daughter out of wedlock. She not only solves the mystery but also discovers that she feels a motherly love for the young girl.

Cast
 Fernanda Montenegro as Maria Izabel "Picucha" de Souza
 Marco Ricca as Sílvio de Souza
 Louise Cardoso as Elaine de Souza
 Mariana Lima as Suzana de Souza
 Matheus Nachtergaele as Fernando de Souza
 Daniel de Oliveira as Jesus Medeiros
 Mirna Spritzer as Zaida
 Elisa Volpatto as Carolina de Souza
 Barbara Borgga as Lenir
 Sérgio Lulkin	 as Seu Dirceu
 Áurea Baptista as Florinha de Souza
 Evandro Soldatelli as Roberto

Awards

See too 
 Doce de Mãe (TV series)

References

External links 
Sweet Mother at the Globo TV International
 

2012 television films
2012 films
2012 drama films
Emmy Award winners
Brazilian television films
2010s Portuguese-language films
Films set in 2012
Rede Globo original programming
Brazilian drama films